Khalkanlu (also Romanized as Khalkānlū) is a village in Sudlaneh Rural District, in the Central District of Quchan County, Razavi Khorasan Province, Iran. At the 2006 census, its population was 745, in 142 families.

References 

Populated places in Quchan County